Swathi Kiranam  is a 1992 Telugu-language musical drama film directed by K. Viswanath. Produced by V. Madhusudhana Rao, the film starred Mammootty in his Telugu debut, Master Manjunath and Raadhika, along with Achyuth, Jayanthi, Sakshi Ranga Rao, Dubbing Janaki and Dharmavarapu Subramanyam in supporting roles. The film is about an egotistical music teacher envious of the immense talent of his prodigious young disciple. The film depicts the tumultuous relationship between an aspiring music composer and his domineering master.

Swathi Kiranam was featured in the Indian panorama section of the 24th IFFI, the Asia Pacific Film Festival, the Moscow Film Festival and the AISFM Film Festival. The film has garnered the National Film Award for Best Female Playback Singer, Filmfare Award for Best Music Direction and the Akkineni Award for Best Home-viewing Feature Film. Over the years, the film has accumulated a cult following for its music, and lyrics. The lyrics were penned by Vennelakanti, Sirivennela Seetarama Sastry, C. Narayana Reddy, and Madugula Nagaphani Sharma.

Plot
The film starts with a shabby old man living as a recluse near a famous temple.  When he ventures out into the village, he is beaten by the shepherds who believe that he is a thief. When they hand him over to the police, the officer in charge identifies him as a once-famous musician, Anantha Rama Sharma (Mammooty), hailed as Sangeeta Samrat (Emperor of music), who has been missing for four years. The inspector Radhakrishna (Achyuth) informs his aunt (Jayanthi), who teaches music in his native village, of this and the past of Anantha Sharma is narrated through flashback.

 Flashback begins
Anantha Rama Sharma is a widely respected Carnatic singer with a big ego. This is established when he rejects the Padma Shri bestowed upon him by the Government of India, as he believes that the other awardees are not worthy to be mentioned alongside him.

Gangadhar (Master Manjunath) lives in the same village. He rejects the society's norms (taking music classes and going to school) and spends his time sitting by the riverside. The river inspires him to sing many songs in different tunes. His music teacher, also the policeman's aunt, recognizes his talent and tries to nurture it. His school teacher (the music teacher's brother) is also fond of Gangadhar.

Gangadhar wants to become a great singer, like Ananta Sharma, and his father (Dharmavarapu Subrahmanyam) encourages him. His day comes when Anantha Sharma is honored in an auditorium. Gangadhar sings a song ("Aanathi Neeyara") in honor of Anantha Sharma, which many consider to be much better than any of Anantha Sharma's works. The boy is hailed as a child prodigy by everyone including Anantha Sharma's wife.

Anantha Sharma wants to imprison Gangadhar's talents. So he asks Gangadhar to stay in his house and learn music as one must be well-experienced to sing on stage. Anantha Sharma makes Gangadhar create songs (which is required by him for a temple), but always acts unimpressed when Ganghadhar creates tunes for the songs. He copies one of Gangadhar's tunes and sings it on stage thinking Gangadhar is absent but Ganga comes to the show. Ananta's wife also finds the hidden stash of all the tunes composed by Gangadhar. He now feels guilty and defends himself by saying that he did it as he was afraid this child would destroy his name and fame.

In this emotional moment, he suffers a heart-attack. To show his gratitude towards his adopted mother, Gangadhar kills himself so that there is no competition for Anantha Sharma. The incident shocks the villagers and they call Anantha Sharma a murderer. To escape their wrath and insults, he runs away and becomes a recluse.
Flashback ends

Ananta Sharma is still unconscious while in the police station. When he awakes, he finds himself in the house of Gangadhar's music teacher. The music teacher's husband tells him that they have forgiven him and asks him to return to his house. At his house, he finds his wife giving music classes (an institute named "Gangadhar Music Academy") for young children. He sits down amongst the children learning the music basics from his wife.

Cast

Production
Director K Viswanath had approached S. P. Balasubrahmanyam to dub for Mammootty in the film. According to SPB, he was ready dub for a great actor like Mammootty. But Mammootty asked the director if he can dub it himself in Telugu with his own voice, even though he did not know Telugu at the time. According to SPB, he said: "I can work hard. If you still do not like it, just do it with Balu Sir." But nothing like this came about. According to SPB, the film was dubbed by Mammootty himself. Though he could not provide the voice, it was SPB who sang the song for Mammootty in the film.

During the composing sessions of this film, the music director K. V. Mahadevan was hospitalized. Hence his close associate and disciple Pughazhendi composed all the songs in the film. But due to his devotion towards the music director, he credited K. V. Mahadevan's name instead of himself. The song “Aanati Neeyara” is written in Thyagaraja Pancharatna Krithi style by Sirivennela Sitaramasastry. Pancharatna Krithis are unique compositions where there are numerous charanams which progress into a crescendo. This song fetched Vani Jayaram the National Film Award for Best Female Playback Singer. This film is the only film to have same lyrical compositions sung by different singers. But with strikingly different compositions. "Pranathi Pranathi" is first sung in Naata by the character of Mammootty which is tuned in a different way again for Master Manjunath to sing brilliantly. The song "Shivani Bhavani" is sung in the same tune but with different emotional levels by the two lead characters Anantha Sharma (Mammootty) and Gangadharam (Master Manjunath) respectively. This film also marked the first and last collaboration of veteran singers Vani Jayaram and K. S. Chithra.

Soundtrack

Reception
The film was released on 1 January 1992 on New Year's Day to widespread critical acclaim. In a retrospect interview of the film by iQlik Movies, they call the film an unmistakable epic by writing: "Swathi Kiranam is called an unmistakable epic because it explores the hidden side of a successful Carnatic Music singer - his inner fears, his insecurities just because he watches a child prodigy grow in front of his own eyes." They further go on to praise the performance of the lead cast. They then praise the script, writing: "Dialogues written by Jandhyala are thought provoking and heart touching. The line where a tormented Gangadharam says ,” Mimmalni choosthe maa amma gari la anipisthunnaru..kaani ayyagaru endhuku thandri la kanipisthunnaro ardham kavatledhu” (“While I can see a mother in you, I don’t know why I am unable to see a father in sir!”) to Anantha Sharma's wife can make anybody tearful." Idlebrain included the film in its series of  "films that were box-office failures but, that deserve to be ranked as some of the best movies of Telugu industry."

Accolades
The film won 1 National Film Award, 1 Nandi Award and 1 Filmfare Award South each. The film was the inaugural recipient of the Nandi Award for Akkineni Award for Best Home-viewing Feature Film.

|-
| 1992
| Vani Jayaram (for song "Aanathi Neeyara")
| National Film Award for Best Female Playback Singer
| 
|-
|1992
| K. V. Mahadevan
|Filmfare Award for Best Music Director – Telugu
| 
|-
|1991
| V. Madhusudhana Rao
|Nandi Award for Akkineni Award for Best Home-viewing Feature Film
| 
|}

References

External links
 

1992 films
1990s Telugu-language films
Films directed by K. Viswanath
Indian nonlinear narrative films
Films about the arts
1990s musical drama films
Films about classical music and musicians
Films scored by K. V. Mahadevan
Indian musical drama films
Indian psychological drama films
Films about teacher–student relationships
1992 drama films